Mary Ross Banks (Ross; after first marriage, Bowdre; after second marriage, Banks; March 4, 1846 – September 15, 1910) was an American litterateur and author of the long nineteenth century. Her literary fame came to her suddenly and was the result of one book, Bright Days on the Old Plantation (Boston, 1882).

Early life and education

Mary Matthews Ross was born in Macon, Georgia, March 4, 1846. On her father's side she was from Scotch ancestry. Her grandfather, Luke Ross (1775-1844), was a wealthy man for his day, and had a well-appointed home, the furniture of which was hauled in wagons from New York City to North Carolina. He moved to Jones County, Georgia, when Macon was a small trading port. Mrs. Banks' father, John Bennett Ross, was one of seven brothers and three sisters. The Ross brothers established themselves in trade about the year 1832, which resulted in commercial success. There were changes in the course of time, some of the brothers embarking in other kinds of business, but John B. Ross continued in the wholesale and retail dry goods and planters' supply business till he died and made so large a fortune that he was known as "the merchant prince of the South." His home was the center of entertainment, and his children were reared in luxury. Married three times, his second wife, Martha Redding, descended from the Lanes and Flewellens, and was Banks' mother. Banks had 11 siblings, included the sisters Flora and Violet, and a brother, William Henry Ross.

Banks was educated in Wesleyan Female College, in Macon, and in the private school of Mrs. Theodosia Bartow Ford.

Career
In 1863, she married Edward Preston Bowdre (1839–1874) of Macon, at that time a captain in the Confederate States Army. She went to the army with her husband and served in the hospitals. At twenty-five years of age, she was a widow with three sons, including Jack Ross Bowdre and Julien Leon Bowdre, and much of the fortune that should have been hers dissipated by the hazard of civil war and the scarcely less trying period of reconstruction.

In June 1875, she married Dr. John Truman Banks (1829–1880) of Griffin, Georgia, a gentleman of high standing, socially and professionally, and lived with him for four years, when she was again a widow. Crushed by her grief, she went to work to help herself and her boys, though she had no training for business, and no knowledge of labor. She was a successful farmer and turned many of her talents and accomplishments into money-making. After raising her sons to the age of independence, she accepted a position in the Department of the Interior at Washington, where she has been assigned to work in the office of the Secretary. 

Her literary fame came to her suddenly and was the result of one book, Bright Days on the Old Plantation (Boston, 1882). It is a narrative of life on a broad plantation in antebellum days, founded on the experiences of the author. There were also a number of sketches and short stories published in various newspapers and periodicals.

Banks was a member of the Daughters of the American Revolution, and was named a delegate to its Continental Congress of April 1910, on behalf of the Mary Hammon Washington Chapter of Macon.

Death
She died at Washington, D.C., September 15, 1910 at age 64, and was interned in Griffin, Georgia.

Selected works

 Bright Days on the Old Plantation, 1882

Notes

References

Attribution

External links
 
 

1846 births
1910 deaths
19th-century American writers
19th-century American women writers
19th-century American memoirists
People from Macon, Georgia
Writers from Georgia (U.S. state)
Women in the American Civil War
American women memoirists
Daughters of the American Revolution people
Wesleyan College alumni
Wikipedia articles incorporating text from A Woman of the Century